Far Eastern Group  is one of the biggest conglomerates in the Republic of China (ROC, Taiwan). It was founded in 1937 by Yu-Ziang Hsu during the mainland Republican period. The group spans over 10 major industries and includes 9 publicly listed companies. The total assets of the group exceed NT$2,500 billion (US$75.8 billion), with annual revenues surpassing NT$610 billion (US$18.7 billion).

Businesses

Petrochemicals and energy

Polyester and synthetic fibers

Cement and building materials

Retail and department stores

Financial services

Sea/land transportation

Communications and Internet

Construction

Hotels

Philanthropic organizations

References

External links
 Far Eastern Group
 Far Eastern Group 
 Far Eastern Group 

 
Conglomerate companies established in 1937